BKI may refer to:

The airport code of Kota Kinabalu International Airport
The ISO 639-3 code of Baki language, Epi Island, Vanuatu
BKI (Bijdragen Koninklijk Instituut), the abbreviated name of the journal Bijdragen tot de Taal-, Land- en Volkenkunde